The 1971 Daytona 500, the 13th running of the event, was a NASCAR Winston Cup Series race held on February 14, 1971 at Daytona International Speedway in Daytona Beach, Florida. Spanning  on the paved oval track, it was the first Daytona 500 in the Winston Cup era of NASCAR. During this time, Richard Petty (the race winner and the eventual Winston Cup champion) was becoming one of the winningest veterans on the NASCAR circuit.

Background

Daytona International Speedway is a race track in Daytona Beach, Florida that is one of six superspeedways to hold NASCAR races, the others being Michigan International Speedway, Auto Club Speedway, Indianapolis Motor Speedway, Pocono Raceway and Talladega Superspeedway. The track also features two other layouts that utilize portions of the primary high speed tri-oval, such as a  sports car course and a  motorcycle course. The track's  infield includes the  Lake Lloyd, which has hosted powerboat racing. The speedway is owned and operated by International Speedway Corporation.

The track was built by NASCAR founder Bill France Sr. to host racing that was being held at the former Daytona Beach Road Course and opened with the first Daytona 500 in 1959. The speedway has been renovated three times, with the infield renovated in 2004, and the track repaved in 1978 and 2010.

The Daytona 500 is regarded as the most important and prestigious race on the NASCAR calendar. It is also the series' first race of the year; this phenomenon is virtually unique in sports, which tend to have championships or other major events at the end of the season rather than the start. Since 1995, U.S. television ratings for the Daytona 500 have been the highest for any auto race of the year, surpassing the traditional leader, the Indianapolis 500 which in turn greatly surpasses the Daytona 500 in in-track attendance and international viewing. The 2006 Daytona 500 attracted the sixth largest average live global TV audience of any sporting event that year with 20 million viewers.

Race report
The manufacturers that were involved included Chevrolet, Mercury, Ford, Plymouth, and Dodge.

The forty car field included legends like A. J. Foyt and David Pearson, both eventually acquiring top-five finishes. A.J. Foyt in the Wood Bros. Mercury had the car to beat all day, but the crew had trouble filling it with gas. He ran out while leading on lap 162. Foyt's crew found out someone crushed the filler neck on the gas tank. There were 34 lead changes in the first 250 miles of the race.

First Daytona 500 starts for Bill Dennis and Maynard Troyer. Only Daytona 500 start for Pedro Rodriguez, Freddy Fryar, Marv Acton, and Larry Baumel. Last Daytona 500 starts for Fred Lorenzen, LeeRoy Yarbrough, and Friday Hassler.

Drivers who failed to qualify for the race were: Ed Negre (#8), Vic Elford (#59), Charlie Roberts (#63), Dick May (#67), J.D. McDuffie (#70), Bill Shirey (#74), Dick Poling (#78), Joe Hines (#80), Bobby Mausgrover (#84), Butch Hirst (#87), Leonard Blanchard (#95), Robert Brown (#58), E.J. Trivette (#56), Roy Mayne (#46), Jimmy Crawford (#02), Pedro Rodríguez (#14), Dub Simpson (#16), Fritz Schultz (#23), Earl Brooks (#26), Bill Hollar (#28), Walter Ballard (#30), Wendell Scott (#34), Blackie Wangerin (#38) and Ken Meisenhelder (#41).

Notable crew chiefs for this race were Paul Goldsmith, Junie Donlavey, Harry Hyde, Dale Inman, Tom Vandiver, Vic Ballard, Jake Elder among others.

Finishing order
Section reference:

 Richard Petty (race time: 3 hours, 27 minutes, 40 seconds)
 Buddy Baker† (10 seconds down)
 A. J. Foyt (less than 1 lap down)
 David Pearson† (1 lap down)
 Fred Lorenzen
 Jim Vandiver† (2 laps down)
 Dick Brooks†
 Jim Hurtubise† (3 laps down)
 James Hylton†
 Bobby Isaac†
 Ramo Stott† (5 laps down)
 Joe Frasson† (6 laps down)
 Pedro Rodríguez†
 Elmo Langley† (7 laps down)
 Freddy Fryar† (8 laps down)
 Bill Champion† (9 laps down)
 Cecil Gordon† (13 laps down)
 Bobby Allison
 Marv Acton (14 laps down)
 Coo Coo Marlin† (16 laps down)
 Tommy Gale† (17 laps down)
 Larry Baumel (21 laps down)
 Ben Arnold†
 Frank Warren (22 laps down)
 Dave Marcis* (27 laps down)
 Donnie Allison* (30 laps down)
 Bill Dennis* (38 laps down)
 Pete Hamilton†* (43 laps down)
 John Sears†* (74 laps down)
 Bill Seifert* (89 laps down)
 Henley Gray* (107 laps down)
 Red Farmer* (109 laps down)
 Cale Yarborough* (139 laps down)
 LeeRoy Yarbrough†* (155 laps down)
 Benny Parsons†* (161 laps down)
 Friday Hassler†* (162 laps down)
 Neil Castles* (176 laps down)
 Maynard Troyer†* (191 laps down in his Cup Series debut)
 Tiny Lund†* (193 laps down)
 Ron Keselowski* (199 laps down)

† Driver is known to be deceased 
* Driver failed to finish race

Timeline
Section reference:
 Start: A.J. Foyt was leading the race as the checkered flag was being waved, Ron Keselowski quit the race.
 Lap 7: Tiny Lund's vehicle had some ignition problems.
 Lap 9: Maynard Troyer spun to the apron of Turn Two and tumbled to the entry to the backstretch.
 Lap 24: Neil Castles' vehicle had some ignition problems.
 Lap 38: Friday Hassler fell out with engine failure. 
 Lap 39: Benny Parsons' vehicle had some ignition problems.
 Lap 45: An oil line problem forced LeeRoy Yarborough out of the race; the car caught fire before Yarbrough could reach the pits. 
 Lap 61: Cale Yarborough fell out with engine failure. 
 Lap 91: Red Farmer managed to ruin his vehicle's engine.
 Lap 93: Henley Gray just could not steer his vehicle properly.
 Lap 111: Bill Seifert just could not steer his vehicle properly.
 Lap 126: John Sears managed to ruin his vehicle's engine.
 Lap 157: Pete Hamilton managed to ruin his vehicle's engine.
 Lap 162: Bill Dennis' vehicle developed a problematic clutch.
 Lap 170: Donnie Allison had a terminal crash, forcing him to leave the event early.
 Lap 173: Dave Marcis managed to ruin his vehicle's engine.
 Finish: Richard Petty was officially declared the winner of the race.

Post-race report

Winnings and championship potential
The winner's purse for the 1971 Daytona 500 was $45,450 American dollars ($ when inflation is taken into effect). Last place finisher received $1,000 ($ with inflation). Richard Petty would go on to win four more Daytona 500 races (1973, 1974, 1979, and 1981). There were seven cautions for forty-four laps.

Attendance
Attendance for the 1971 Daytona 500 reached 80,000 spectators; Expansion in the next eighteen years would bring attendance up to 180,000 people. ABC's Wide World of Sports televised the race. The commentary was done by the legendary Chris Economaki who did the Daytona 500 races in the 1970s.

End of a tradition
All of the vehicles utilized during that running of the Daytona 500 were based on street version sheet metal and engine blocks of cars manufactured between 1969 and 1971. Deviation of up to two or three model years was expected because parity wasn't enforced by NASCAR during that era and different teams had different budgets from each other.

Out of the forty racers competing in the 1971 Daytona 500, thirty-nine were American and one was Mexican. Pedro Rodriguez (who would finish in thirteenth place) would have an asphalt racing course named after him after he died six months later in Germany during a sports car race (along with his older brother Ricardo Rodríguez).

In this race, Dick Brooks would be the final driver to make a competitive run with a winged vehicle. Following the 1970 season, special, limited production 'aero' cars such as the Dodge Daytona and Plymouth Superbird, as well as the Ford Torino Talladega and Mercury Spoiler II, were restricted to a 305 ci engine. Brooks' Mario Rossi team was the only team to run a winged car in the race, and although they had a 7th-place run in the race, elected to run a conventional big-block powered car the rest of the season. Rear wings would not appear again in NASCAR until 2008 with the 'Car of Tomorrow'.

References

Notes

External links
 Donnie Allison's Starting Position for the 1971 Daytona 500

Daytona 500
Daytona 500
Daytona 500
NASCAR races at Daytona International Speedway